Cesare Gentile (Genoa, 1614 - Genoa, 1681) was the 119th Doge of the Republic of Genoa and king of Corsica.

Biography 
At age 53, on May 10, 1667, the Grand Council elected Gentile as the new doge of Genoa, the seventy-fourth in two-year succession and the nineteenth in republican history. As doge he was also invested with the related biennial office of king of Corsica. He led an almost peaceful and administrative Dogate, except for some disagreements with the Chapter of the Genoa Cathedral, with the Genoese archbishop Giambattista Spinola and with the Inquisitor of the Holy Office. The dogate ceased on May 10, 1669 Cesare Gentile still dealt with public assignments. He died in Genoa in 1681.

See also 

 Republic of Genoa
 Doge of Genoa

References 

17th-century Doges of Genoa
1614 births
1681 deaths